Jack Hardy may refer to:
Jack Hardy (labor leader) (1901–1993), American labor leader, teacher, and author
Jack Hardy (politician) (1924–2006), Manitoba politician
Jack Hardy (singer-songwriter) (1947–2011), folk musician
Jack Hardy (catcher) (1877–1921), catcher in Major League Baseball
Jack Hardy (pitcher) (born 1959), pitcher in Major League Baseball
Jack Hardy (footballer) (1927–1998), Australian rules footballer
Jack Hardy (rugby union) (born 1999), Australian rugby player

See also
John Hardy (disambiguation)